Moklen is an Austronesian language spoken on the western coast of southern Thailand. It is related to but distinct from the Moken language of Myanmar and southern Thailand. Unlike Moken, it is not spoken in Myanmar.

Dialects 
 lists three main Moklen areas in Thailand. Moklen is spoken mostly, but not exclusively, in Phang Nga Province. It is also spoken in Ranong Province and Phuket Island.
There is a high degree of interaction with Moken in the Ko Phra Thɔɔng area.
Central Moklen area (nine villages): from Paak Wiip (in Takua Pa District) to Hin Laat.
Southern Moklen area (three villages): northern tip of Phuket Island.

 describes the Moklen dialect of Lam Phi, Thai Mueang District, Phang Nga Province in southern Thailand.

 survey various Moklen dialects.

References

Works cited

Further reading 

 

Moklenic languages
Languages of Myanmar
Languages of Thailand